Pelayo "Cortina" Chacón Cortina (September 22, 1888 – March 11, 1971) was a Cuban baseball shortstop and manager in the Cuban League and Negro leagues.

Nicknamed "Cortina" or "The Curtain" he played from the age of 19, from 1908 to 1931 with several clubs, including Almendares, Azul, Club Fé, Habana, Cuban House of David, the New York Cubans, and the Cuban Stars (East). Chacón also managed the New York Cubans from 1916 to 1919 where he also played shortstop.

When the Negro National League formed in 1920, Chacón played for the Hilldale Club, then moved to the Cuban Stars (East) where he played most of the rest of his career.

It appears he played his final games at the age of 42 for the Cuban House of David baseball team.

He was elected to the Cuban Baseball Hall of Fame in 1949.

Moore received votes listing him on the 1952 Pittsburgh Courier player-voted poll of the Negro Leagues' best players ever.

References

External links
 and Baseball-Reference Black Baseball stats and Seamheads

1888 births
1971 deaths
Almendares (baseball) players
Azul (baseball) players
Cuban baseball players
Cuban House of David players
Cuban League players
Club Fé players
Habana players
Negro league baseball managers
Santa Marta (baseball club) players